Argyria pontiella is a moth in the family Crambidae. It was described by Zeller in 1877. It is found in Panama.

References

Argyriini
Moths described in 1877
Moths of Central America